Catriona Elisa Magnayon Gray (born 6 January 1994) is a Filipino-Australian model, singer, beauty queen, television personality, youth advocate and arts ambassador best known for winning the title of Miss Universe 2018. She is the fourth Filipina to win the Miss Universe competition. Previously, Gray was crowned Miss Universe Philippines 2018 and Miss World Philippines 2016.

Early life and education

Catriona Elisa Magnayon Gray was born in Cairns, Queensland, Australia to an Australian father of Scottish descent, Ian Gray, and a Filipino mother, Normita Ragas Magnayon, from Oas, Albay, Philippines. Gray is reportedly named after her paternal grandmother, Catherine Gray (née Ross), an immigrant to Western Australia from Scotland in 1952 and Elsa Magnayon (née Ragas), her maternal grandmother from Oas, Albay, Philippines.

Gray was a student at Trinity Anglican School in Cairns where she was a house captain and a school chorister. She received a graduate certificate in music theory from Berklee College of Music in Boston, Massachusetts. In addition, she obtained a certificate in outdoor recreation and a black belt in Choi Kwang-Do martial arts. Furthermore, Gray was lead singer of her school's jazz band; she also starred in local productions of Miss Saigon. After graduating from high school, she moved to Manila where she worked as a commercial model.

Gray is currently working with an organization Young Focus Philippines since May 2016. She is also a Love Yourself Philippines and Smile Train ambassador.

Pageantry

Little Miss Philippines 1999
Her foray into the world of pageantry began in 1999 when she won Little Miss Philippines in Sydney at the age of five.

Miss World Philippines 2016

On 2 October 2016, Gray was crowned Miss World Philippines 2016 where she won the following special awards:
 Best in Swimsuit
 Best in Evening Gown
 Best in Fashion Runway
 Best in Talent

In addition, Gray won the following corporate endorsement  awards:
 Miss FIG Image Gateway
 Miss Folded and Hung
 Miss Hannah Beach Resort
 Miss Figlia
 Miss Manila Hotel
 Miss Organique

During the Top 12 question and answer round she was asked, "When you get up in the morning and look in the mirror, what do you see?", she answered:

During the final question and answer round all the five finalist were asked the same question, "Why should you be Miss World Philippines 2016?," Gray answered:

On 3 September 2017, Gray crowned Laura Lehmann as her successor at the Miss World Philippines 2017 pageant held at the Mall of Asia Arena in Pasay City, Philippines.

Miss World 2016

After winning the national competition, Gray competed at Miss World 2016 held in MGM National Harbor, in Oxon Hill, Maryland, United States where she was placed in the Top 5. Gray won the following awards:
 Multimedia Award
 Talent Award (2nd place)
 Top 5 (Beauty with a Purpose project)

During the question and answer portion, she was asked by the reigning Miss World 2015 Mireia Lalaguna, "Which qualities do you think it will take to wear my crown?", she answered:

Gray concluded her Miss World journey by finishing as a Top 5 finalist. Stephanie Del Valle of Puerto Rico won the said pageant.

Binibining Pilipinas 2018

On 8 January 2018, Gray submitted her application to Binibining Pilipinas to officially join the  2018 national pageant. 8 days later, Binibining Pilipinas national director Stella Araneta confirmed that Gray will be officially competing at the Binibining Pilipinas 2018 pageant.

During the national costume competition, Gray wore a Muslim princess attire from Mindanao and bagged the national costume award. On 18 March 2018, she was crowned as Miss Universe Philippines 2018 by the outgoing titleholder Rachel Peters.

Gray obtained the following corporate and contest awards:
 Best in National Costume
 Best in Evening Gown
 Best in Swimsuit
 Miss Jag Denim Queen Award (Endorsement)
 Miss Ever Bilena Cosmetics Award (Endorsement)

She also obtained the following popularity contest prizes:
 Dairy Queen's Award
 Pizza Hut's Award 2018

In Philippine beauty pageant history, Gray is the first Filipino to represent the country in both the Miss World and Miss Universe competitions, and the second to represent the Philippines in two major international pageants, the first being Carlene Aguilar in 2005.

At her national competition, United States Ambassador to the Philippines Sung Yong Kim asked the following: "After the devastating war—Marawi is now on its way to recovery, what will be your message to the young women of Marawi?":

On 9 June 2019, Gray crowned Gazini Ganados as her successor at the Binibining Pilipinas 2019 pageant held at the Smart Araneta Coliseum in Quezon City, Philippines.

Miss Universe 2018

Gray represented the Philippines in the 2018 Miss Universe competition on 17 December 2018 held at IMPACT Arena, Muang Thong Thani in Nonthaburi Province, Thailand.

During the national costume show presentation, Gray showcased a beaded tribal suit featuring the indigenous tribes of the ancient pagan Filipinos, alongside an oversized Parol painted Christmas lantern pulled by a roller device. The costume was accompanied by a pre-Christian Shamanic dance of the historical Babaylan paganism. The costume gained both support and criticism, due to the perceived difficulty of walking and the failure of LEDs to function, whilst Gray cited her scoliosis ailment.

In the pageant's preliminary stages, Catriona Gray did a slow-motion walk, (nicknamed lava walk, along with a slow-mo turn) on the ramp in the swimwear competition wearing a pink swimsuit, which was praised by supermodels Tyra Banks and Ashley Graham, fashion commentators and Internet viewers. At the preliminary evening gown competition, she wore Mak Tumang's golden sweetheart gown with a thigh-high slit inspired by the Ibong Adarna and the Mikimoto crown.

At the coronation, Gray advanced to Top 20. In the opening statement segment, she expressed:
"Working in some of the poorest areas of my country, I found that it was a lack of child support, not poverty, that killed their dreams. A child once told me, 'Cat, that’s just not my life, and those dreams aren’t made for me.' But I stand here today because someone believed in me and we owe it to our children to believe in them."

Gray advanced to Top 10. She wore a pink Sirivannavari bikini and a cape with gold-winged shoulder straps at the swimsuit competition. At the evening gown competition, she wore Mak Tumang's Mayon gown. The Mayon gown was made up of tulle encrusted with Swarovski crystals in 12-toned color palette that ranged from yellow to dark red. Its body-fitting, bare back design features a side cutout and a high slit that "highlighted Gray's legs." The dress, which according to Tumang weighed 10 pounds, was a tribute to Mayon Volcano, a tourist attraction in the province of Albay, the hometown of Gray's mother. In an interview, Gray decided to pick the gown for the beauty pageant as her mother dreamed of her winning the Miss Universe crown wearing a red dress.

Gray then advanced to Top 5. During the first question and answer round, Gray was asked by host Steve Harvey, "Canada recently joined Uruguay as the second nation in the world to make marijuana legal. What is your opinion on the legalization of marijuana?" She responded:"I’m for it being used for medical use, but not so for recreational use. Because I think if people were to argue: Then what about alcohol and cigarettes? Well, everything is good but in moderation."

Gray advanced to Top 3. In the final question and answer portion, the top three contestants were asked the same question by Harvey: "What is the most important lesson you’ve learned in your life and how will you apply it to your time as Miss Universe?" She answered:"I work a lot in the slums of Tondo, Manila and the life there is very... it's poor and it's very sad. And I’ve always taught myself to look for the beauty in it; to look in the beauty in the faces of the children, and to be grateful. And I would bring this aspect as a Miss Universe to see situations with a silver lining, and to assess where I could give something, where I could provide something as a spokesperson. And this I think if I could also teach people to be grateful, we could have an amazing world where negativity could not grow and foster, and children will have a smile on their faces."At the end of the event, Gray won the competition and was crowned by her predecessor, Demi-Leigh Nel-Peters of South Africa. She is the fourth Filipino Miss Universe after Gloria Diaz in 1969, Margie Moran in 1973, and Pia Wurtzbach in 2015.

On 20 December 2018, Gray made a courtesy call with President Rodrigo Duterte at the Villamor Airbase in Pasay.

On 22 January 2019, Gray traveled to Indonesia to shoot a commercial for C 1000, a vitamin brand available in Indonesia.

On 16 February 2019, Gray arrived in the Philippines for a week-long homecoming celebration with visits to the cities of Manila, Makati, Pasay and Quezon City. However, on 23 February 2019, The feather of her Mikimoto Crown fell off during her homecoming parade in Araneta Center, Cubao, Quezon City. She also made courtesy calls to the Congress of the Philippines, Senate of the Philippines and Malacañang Palace.

On 16 September 2019, Gray became the first ever Filipino celebrity to be the included in the voice options on the Waze app that is made possible by BDO. However, it was discontinued on 6 December 2019 and was replaced by Mimiyuuuh, just 2 days before her reign ended.

On 17 October 2019, Gray attended the 2019 Latin Music Awards at the Dolby Theatre, Hollywood and Highlands in Los Angeles, California where she presented the 2019 "Canción Favorita – Tropical" award for the song "Adicto" to Marc Anthony and Prince Royce.

On 5 December 2019, Gray attended the release of the new Mouawad Crown for the Miss Universe pageant, which is nicknamed Power of Unity, retiring the Mikimoto Crown.

In her capacity as Miss Universe, Gray visited Brazil, Indonesia, Thailand, South Africa, various cities and states across the United States, and her home country of the Philippines. She also visited Canada and United Arab Emirates to meet with her pageant sponsors and Filipino supporters.

On 8 December 2019, Gray crowned Zozibini Tunzi of South Africa as her successor at the 68th Miss Universe pageant at Tyler Perry Studios, Atlanta, Georgia, United States.

Post Miss Universe

On 6 September 2020, Gray became the ambassador of the Philippine Red Cross during the COVID-19 pandemic.

She became the host and performer of the TV5 variety show Sunday Noontime Live!.

Gray served as a backstage correspondent of the Miss Universe 2022 finals, alongside Zuri Hall.

In her capacity as former Miss Universe, Gray visited Italy and Colombia in 2020, Singapore and Vietnam in 2022.

Advocacy and issues 
Gray has advocated for women's rights, indigenous culture conservation, and the "One Town, One Product" (OTOP) project of the Philippines' Department of Trade and Industry. She has continued to pursue her women's rights advocacies despite some incidents when military officials attempted to pressure her into limiting her interactions with certain women's rights groups.

Ambassador for the Arts, and for Indigenous Handicrafts

In February 2020, the Philippines' National Commission for Culture and the Arts (NCCA) designated Catriona Gray as the agency's Ambassador for the Arts. Gray was named ambassador yet again in 2021, and was announced as host for "Kultura 101," an NCCA Web Series where Gray said she would "share [her] passion for aspects of Filipino culture whether it be our textiles, our dances, our food."

Gray was also named an Ambassador for Indigenous Handicrafts by the Philippines' Department of Trade and Industry in July 2020.

Parlade red-tagging incident 
Gray responded strongly when she was drawn into the Philippines' Red-tagging issue, due to an incident in October 2020 when AFP Southern Luzon Command commander Lt. Gen. Antonio Parlade Jr. said that Gray and actress Liza Soberano should not support Gabriela and other rights groups, as fellow celebrity Angel Locsin has done, or they would be drawn into the activities of the Marxist-Leninist-Maoist New People's Army, and risk being killed in a clash with the army just like activists who had allegedly joined that group.

In response, Gray's lawyer Atty. Joji Alonso issued a statement saying Parlade's statements were "uncalled for," further saying: "Catriona will not waver in continuously championing social causes that uplift women’s lives. While there may be people who will try, she remains steadfast in her stance that no one should be silenced in sharing their personal stories that give strength and support to fellow women who have gone through similar experiences."

Personal life
On 12 June 2012, Gray was in a relationship with Filipino-German actor and model Clint Bondad, until they broke up on 23 February 2019.

On 23 May 2020, it was revealed that Gray is in a relationship with a Filipino-American actor, Sam Milby. On 16 February 2023, Gray announced her engagement with Milby.

Discography

Singles

Filmography

Television

Radio

Awards and nominations

See also 

 Gloria Diaz
 Margie Moran
 Pia Wurtzbach
 Binibining Pilipinas
 Philippines at Major Beauty Pageants

Notes

References

External links

 

1994 births
Living people
Miss Universe winners
Miss Universe 2018 contestants
Miss World 2016 delegates
Miss World Philippines winners
Filipino female models
Filipino people of Australian descent
Filipino people of Scottish descent
Berklee College of Music alumni
Binibining Pilipinas winners
People from Albay
People from Metro Manila
Australian female models
Australian people of Filipino descent
Australian people of Scottish descent
People from Cairns
Filipino female martial artists
Australian female martial artists
Filipino musical theatre actresses